eFestivals is a website listing music festivals; hosting information on line-ups, interviews, photographs and live reviews.

The website boasts an active discussion board with over 225,000 registered users,  which now runs on a separate server from the main website due to its popularity.   A 'gold membership' is available for £18 per annum, which prevents third party websites from being displayed while using the site. 

In May 2019, eFestivals launched an appeal for donations to help cover the website's running costs and to secure the future of the website.

History 
The website was launched in 1998 as "The Original Glastonbury Website", and was adopted by Glastonbury Festival as the official website for the 1999 event.  In 2000, eFestivals was launched to cater for multiple festivals (over 200 were listed in 2006), and has been cited as bringing attention to smaller-scale festivals.

In 2007, sister website eGigs.co.uk was first registered, which mirrors the format of eFestivals but relates to individual gigs rather than festivals.

References

External links 
eFestivals website

British music websites
Music festival organizations
Glastonbury Festival